Bjerkestrand is a Norwegian surname. Notable people with the surname include:

Iver Bjerkestrand (born 1987), Norwegian alpine skier
Kjetil Bjerkestrand (born 1955), Norwegian musician, composer, arranger, and record producer

Norwegian-language surnames